Pranab Chatterjee (1929–1979) was an Indian politician. He was a Member of Parliament, representing Bihar in the Rajya Sabha the upper house of India's Parliament as a member of the Janata Party.

References

Rajya Sabha members from Bihar
Janata Party politicians
1929 births
1979 deaths